Theophilus Butler, 1st Baron Newtown-Butler (1669 – 11 March 1724), was an Irish politician and peer.

Butler was the son of Francis Butler and Judith Jones. He was educated at Trinity College, Dublin. He sat in the Irish House of Commons as the Member of Parliament for Cavan County between 1703 and 1713. In 1711, he was made a member of the Privy Council of Ireland. He then represented Belturbet from 1713 to 1714. In 1715, he was raised to the peerage as Baron Newtown-Butler in the Peerage of Ireland, and assumed his seat in the Irish House of Lords. The title was created with special remainder to the heirs male of his father; upon Lord Newtown-Butler dying without children in 1724, the title passed to his younger brother, Brinsley Butler, who was made Viscount Lanesborough in 1728. Theophilus married Emily Stopford, eldest daughter of the Cromwellian officer James Stopford of Newhall, County Meath and his second wife Mary Forth.

References

1669 births
1724 deaths
Barons in the Peerage of Ireland
Irish MPs 1703–1713
Irish MPs 1713–1714
Members of the Irish House of Lords
Members of the Parliament of Ireland (pre-1801) for County Cavan constituencies
Members of the Privy Council of Ireland
Peers of Ireland created by George I
Alumni of Trinity College Dublin